Gintautėlė Laimutė Baginskienė  (born 1940) is a Lithuanian painter.

In 1958–1964 she studied the Lithuanian Institute of Art.

Her spouse is Prof. Tadas Baginskas, and daughter is chessplayer Kamilė Baginskaitė.

Works
Her work is monumental, decorative shapes, highlighting fabric of minerals, metals properties. Leaded Glass conditional forms, decorative compositions, laconic, the later - expressive. Colorless and colored glass dish sets (1970–1971 m.) is neat silhouettes, nedekoruoti.

Creator of ornamental metal products:
  Wall display of minerals in the USSR pavilion at Expo-67 Montreal, with a T. Baginsku Baginski
  T. Pan's Soviet pavilion at Expo-70 "Osaka, the T. Baginsku Baginski
  Pan Geology of the USSR in the exhibition in Paris, 1971, the
  Pan Lithuanian national economy in the exhibition in Santiago, 1972, the

Stained-glass panels from the minerals:
  Geology of the USSR in the exhibition in Milan and Damascus, both of 1975.

Stained glass from the glass:
  Trakai Restaurant "head", 1973, 1997
  Kedainiai restaurant, 1976
  Klaipeda Chamber of marriages, 1984
  Lithuanian Sea Museum, 1986
  Panevezys Cultural Center, Forest Tree Grew, 1989
  Utena brewery in 1995
  The discovery of the Cross Church, 1997

See also
List of Lithuanian painters

References

Lithuanian painters
1940 births
Living people
Vilnius Academy of Arts alumni
20th-century Lithuanian women artists
21st-century Lithuanian women artists